Kakumiro District is a district in the Western Region of Uganda.

Location
The districts surrounding Kakumiro District include Hoima District to the north, Kyegegwa District to the north-east, Kiboga District to the east, Mubende District to the south-east, Kyegegwa District to the south, and Kibaale District to the west.

Overview
The district was created by the government of Uganda, effective 1 July 2016, when Kibaale District was split into three creating the current districts of Kagadi, Kakumiro and Kibaale.

Population
In July 2017, the population of Kakumiro District was estimated at approximately 300,000 people.

References

External links
  Kakumiro District Information Portal

 
Bunyoro sub-region
Districts of Uganda
Western Region, Uganda